Pilar, officially the Municipality of Pilar,  is a 4th class municipality in the province of Bohol, Philippines. According to the 2020 census, it has a population of 28,693 people.

The town of Pilar, Bohol celebrates its fiesta on October 10, to honor the town patron Virgen del Pilar.

History

Pilar was formerly a barrio known as Banlasan (later renamed Alegria), which is used to be the town center of the municipality of Sierra Bullones. Constant flooding from Wahig River led residents of Sierra Bullones to transfer their town center at barangay Candagaz and named it as Poblacion. Alegria was then called Lungsod Daan which means old town.

On December 29, 1961, Lungsod Daan became an independepent municipality and it was renamed Pilar after the patron saint, Virgen del Pilar. A total of 16 barangays from the municipalities of Candijay, Guindulman, Sierra Bullones, and Ubay are carved out from their territories to form the new municipality through the Executive Order No. 460 issued by President Carlos P. Garcia, becoming the 45th town in the province 
Below is list of 16 original barrios of Pilar:

Consequently, president Carlos P.  Garcia named Demetria B. Buslon and Marcos Auguis as first mayor and vice-mayor of the town respectively. Also appointed were first councilors Sinoforoso Cabañez, Dionisio Cagas, Anastacio Jasper, and Celestino Ente.

Geography

Barangays
Pilar comprises 21 barangays:

Climate

Demographics

Economy

Gallery

References

External links
 [ Philippine Standard Geographic Code]
Pilar
Municipality of Pilar

Municipalities of Bohol
Establishments by Philippine executive order